Bait al-mal may refer to:

 Bayt al-mal, a financial institution responsible for the administration of taxes in Islamic states
 Ibrahim Bait Almal, a rebel military commander in Misrata